Habib Painter or Habeeb Painter (1915 – 22 February 1987) was a noted Indian Qawwal and a folk singer. There is a park named in honour of Habib Painter in Aligarh near Paan Wali Kothi named as Bulbuley Hind Habib Painter Park

Early life
He was born in 1915 and brought up in Aligarh. He started his profession as a billboard painter, hence he became known as "Habib Painter". Once Rais Mirza, a host of poetry-reading events (mushairas) saw him singing Qawwali, he brought him to Delhi and introduced him as a Qawwal.

Habib painter
Habeeb Painter had a good voice as well good command over the language. 
Habib Painter is still considered an important Qawwali performer in the Indian subcontinent.

He was a spiritual disciple of Sufi saint Nizamuddin Auliya and the thirteenth century legendary poet/musician Amir Khusro.

Death
Habib Painter died on 22 February 1987 at age 72.

Title
During the war between India and china, Indian artists contributed their voice to inspire the nation. And Habeeb, too, sang for the troops. The then Prime Minister of India Jawaharlal Nehru honoured him with the title "Bulbul-e-Hind" (Nightingale of India).

There is a park named in honour of Habib Painter in Aligarh near Paan Wali Kothi named as Bulbuley Hind Habib Painter Park

Notable Qawwali songs
 "Wo har zarre me hai"
 "Nas nas bole nabee nabee"
 "Bahuot Kathin hai dagar pan ghat ki" (Lyrics: Amir Khusro)
 "Fana Itna to ho jaaun"
 "Baap ki naseehat beti ko"
 "Wo sadaa chakkar me rehte haiN"
 "Nhi malum nhi malun"
 "Ghar ka bhedi lanka dhay"
 "mai ab kuch keh nhi sakta"
 "kare koi bhare koi"
 " ye meri haqiqat hai"
 "koshish na krna"
 "poshida poshida"
 "bura kisko manu"
 "kitni zalim hai duniya"
 "bharosa kis pe kijey ga"
 "bhagwan isi mai milte hai"
 "ranjid ranjida"
 "dedar ho jaye"
 "aaj tuna mai eysa jalungi"
 "main to anware nabi huun"

References

External links
Qawwali music article on Encyclopedia Britannica
 Youtube - Bahut kathin hai dagar pan ghat ki by Habib Painter

1915 births
1987 deaths
Indian qawwali singers
People from Aligarh
Indian male folk singers
20th-century Indian singers
Singers from Uttar Pradesh
20th-century Indian male singers